Owch Bolagh (also Romanized as Owch Bolāgh and Ūchbolāgh; also known as Owch Bolāgh Ankūt) is a village in Angut-e Sharqi Rural District, Anguti District, Germi County, Ardabil Province, Iran. At the 2006 census, its population was 84, in 15 families.

References 

Towns and villages in Germi County